Justin Fenton is an American author, journalist and crime reporter.

Career
Fenton reported for the Baltimore Sun for 17 years. A graduate of the University of Maryland College Park, Fenton worked as a reporter and editor for the student newspaper, The Diamondback, and then started at The Sun as an intern. Fenton was part of the Pulitzer Prize finalist staff recognised for their coverage of the Baltimore riots that followed the death of Freddie Gray. He was also one of the lead reporters who reported on Baltimore's Gun Trace Task Force scandal. Fenton later wrote a book depicting the entire case called We Own This City, which was later produced by HBO into a TV mini series of the same name.  Fenton himself appears in two episodes of We Own This City, playing a press conference reporter. Earlier, in 2010, his reporting led to an overhaul in how Baltimore police officers investigate sexual assaults.

Awards and recognition 
Along with several state awards, Fenton is a two-time finalist for the national Livingston Award for Young Journalists and was part of The Sun's Pulitzer Prize-finalist team, rewarded for their coverage of the death of Freddie Gray and ensuing unrest. The Daily Record, the local legal and business newspaper, named Fenton as an "Influential Marylander".

References

People from Baltimore
People from Maryland
Living people
Year of birth missing (living people)